Oliver Grundmann (born 21 August 1971) is a German politician of the Christian Democratic Union (CDU) who has been serving as a member of the Bundestag from the state of Lower Saxony since 2013.

Political career 
Grundmann became a member of the Bundestag after the 2013 German federal election, representing the Stade I – Rotenburg II district. In parliament, he is a member of the Committee on the Environment, Nature Conservation and Nuclear Safety.

References

External links 

  
 Bundestag biography 

1971 births
Living people
Members of the Bundestag for Lower Saxony
Members of the Bundestag 2021–2025
Members of the Bundestag 2017–2021
Members of the Bundestag 2013–2017
Members of the Bundestag for the Christian Democratic Union of Germany